Karsch may refer to:

 Anna Louisa Karsch (1722–1791), German autodidact and poet
 Doug Karsch (born 1969), American talk radio show host and Michigan Wolverines sports reporter
 Ferdinand Karsch (1853–1936), German arachnologist and entomologist
 Joachim Karsch (1897–1945), German artist
 Johannes Waldemar Karsch (1881–1939), German Esperantist
 Tom Karsch, the former Executive Vice President and General Manager for Turner Classic Movies and Turner South